Åge Rønning (4 October 1925 – 31 January 1991) was a Norwegian writer and journalist.

Biography
Åge Rønning was born in Oslo, Norway. His parents were Normann Rønning (1888–1974) and Astrid Therese Nielsen (1895–1978). He graduated in 1944 at Vahl School. He had a career in journalism working for  Verdens Gang 1945–47, Norsk Telegrambyrå 1947–54 and Morgenbladet until 1964. His debut novel Fotfeste for elskere was published in 1954. His writings often reflected his Roman Catholic faith and focused on related religious issues. From 1968 to 1969, Rønning was a deputy and from 1978 board member of the Norwegian Authors' Union. He was affected by multiple sclerosis starting in 1967 and was from 1980 depending on a wheelchair.

Awards
1959-  Gyldendal's Endowment (Gyldendals legat)  jointly with Alf Larsen
1979 - Riksmål Society Literature Prize (Riksmålsforbundets litteraturpris)
1982 - Norwegian Critics Prize for Literature (Kritikerprisen) for the novel Kolbes reise 
1989 - Dobloug Prize (Doblougprisen) from the Swedish Academy jointly  with Eldrid Lunden

Selected works
Fotfeste for elskere   (1954)
Kvinnene   (1957)
Narrens krets   (1960)
De ukjentes marked   (1966)
Alle klovner    (1971)
Komedien om slottsherrene   (1974)
Fortsettelse i Hamburg   (1987)
Arvingen kommer torsdag   (1981)
Kolbes reise (1982)

References

1925 births
1991 deaths
Writers from Oslo
Norwegian male poets
Norwegian male novelists
20th-century Norwegian poets
20th-century Norwegian novelists
20th-century Norwegian male writers
Dobloug Prize winners
Norwegian Critics Prize for Literature winners
20th-century Norwegian journalists